William Berkeley may refer to:
 William de Berkeley, 1st Marquess of Berkeley (1426–1492), English nobleman
 William Berkeley (MP died 1552), MP for Hereford
 William Berkeley (governor) (1605–1677), colonial governor of Virginia
 William Berkeley (Royal Navy officer) (1639–1666), English naval officer
 William Berkeley, 4th Baron Berkeley of Stratton (died 1741), English politician and judge
 William Berkeley, 1st Earl FitzHardinge (1786–1857), British landowner and politician
 W. R. Berkley (William Robert Berkley, born 1946), founder and chairman of W. R. Berkley Corporation

See also
 William Berkeley Lewis (1784–1866), American civil servant
 William Barclay (disambiguation)